Prayer for a Child is a 1944 book by Rachel Field. Its artwork by Elizabeth Orton Jones won it a Caldecott Medal in 1945. The whole book is narrated by a little girl, but it represents children as a whole. It reflects their love of God, and their gentleness to humankind as a whole.

Critical reception 
Prayer for a Child received positive reviews. Kirkus Reviews described it as "A beautiful piece of bookmaking". The New York Times said "The pictures and the prayer itself speak to a child in a child's language; older people will find this little volume beautiful, moving and deeply satisfying."

References

Caldecott Medal–winning works
1944 children's books
American picture books
Christian prayer